Peter Preston Brooks (born 1938) is an American literary theorist who is Sterling Professor Emeritus of Comparative Literature at Yale University and Andrew W. Mellon Scholar in the Department of Comparative Literature and the Center for Human Values at Princeton University.  He has been Professor in the Department of English and School of Law at the University of Virginia. Among his many accomplishments is the founding of the Whitney Humanities Center at Yale University. He was elected to the American Philosophical Society in 2003. Brooks is an interdisciplinary scholar whose work cuts across French and English literature, law, and psychoanalysis. He was influenced by fellow Yale scholar, Paul de Man, to whom his book Reading for the Plot is dedicated. His 2022 book Seduced By Story was a finalist for the 2023 National Book Critics Circle award in criticism.

Education
Brooks obtained his B.A. (1959) and Ph.D. (1965) from Harvard University. He also studied at University College, London as a Marshall Scholar, and at the University of Paris.

Personal life 
Brooks has five children. On 18 July 1959, Brooks married Margaret Elisabeth Waters. On 12 May 2001, Brooks married the law professor, author and commentator, Rosa Brooks. The couple later divorced.

Bibliography

Books
Non-fiction
 The Novel of Worldliness: Crébillon, Marivaux, Laclos, Stendhal (1969)
 The Melodramatic Imagination: Balzac, Henry James, Melodrama, and the Mode of Excess (1976), 
 Reading for the Plot: Design and Intention in Narrative (1984), 
 Body Work: Objects of Desire in Modern Narrative (1993), 
 Psychoanalysis and Storytelling (1994), 
 Law's Stories: Narrative and Rhetoric in the Law (co-editor with Paul Gewirtz, 1996), 
 Troubling Confessions: Speaking Guilt in Law and Literature (2000), 
 Whose Freud? The Place of Psychoanalysis in Contemporary Culture (co-editor with Alex Woloch) (2000),  
 Realist Vision (2005), 
 Henry James Goes to Paris  (2007), 
 Enigmas of Identity (2011), 
 Anthologie du mélodrame classique (with Myriam Faten Sfar, 2011), 
 Flaubert in the Ruins of Paris:  The Story of a Friendship, a Novel, and a Terrible Year (2017), 
 Balzac's Lives (2020), 
 Seduced by Story (2022), 

Fiction
 World Elsewhere (2000), 
 The Emperor's Body (2010),

Papers

References

External links
Emeritus Faculty bio at Yale Comp Lit department
bio at Princeton Comp Lit department

1938 births
Living people
Yale University faculty
Alumni of University College London
University of Paris alumni
Harvard Advocate alumni
Princeton University faculty
Yale Sterling Professors
Members of the American Philosophical Society
American expatriates in England
American expatriates in France
Corresponding Fellows of the British Academy